Acridone alkaloids are natural products derived from acridone.

Occurrence 
Acridone alkaloids are found in bark, wood, leaves and roots of rue plants, especially in roots and suspension cultures of rue.

Examples 
This group is named after the acridone. Further members are acronycin, melicopicine and rutacridone, among others:

Properties 
Many acridone alkaloids are methylated on the nitrogen atom and also have two oxygen functional groups, which can be free, alkylated or incorporated into rings. Acridone alkaloids show a blue-green fluorescence so that they can be detected with UV light. Some alkaloids of this group are effective against malaria pathogens. Furthermore, acronycin inhibits cell division.

References 

Alkaloids by chemical classification